Ahmet Özdemirok (born 25 January 1981) is a Swedish footballer of Turkish descent. He plays for Superettan club Varbergs BoIS FC.

External links

Ahmet Özdemirok till Varbergs BoIS 

1981 births
Hammarby Fotboll players
Syrianska FC players
Swedish footballers
Living people
Association football midfielders